Minakhan Assembly constituency is an assembly constituency in North 24 Parganas district in the Indian state of West Bengal. It is reserved for scheduled castes.

Overview
As per orders of the Delimitation Commission, 122 Minakhan Assembly constituency (SC) is composed of the following: Minakhan community development block, and Bakjuri, Kulti, Shalipur and Sonapukur Sankarpur gram panchayats of Haroa community development block.

Minakhan Assembly constituency (SC) is part of 18. Basirhat (Lok Sabha constituency).

Members of Legislative Assembly

Election results

2021

2016

2011

References

Assembly constituencies of West Bengal
Politics of North 24 Parganas district